Governor Talmadge may refer to:

Eugene Talmadge (1884–1946), 67th Governor of Georgia
Herman Talmadge (1913–2002), 71st Governor of Georgia

See also
Nathaniel P. Tallmadge (1795–1864), 3rd Governor of Wisconsin Territory